Oliver is an unincorporated community in Center Township, Posey County, in the U.S. state of Indiana.

History
A post office was established at Oliver in 1883, and remained in operation until 1934. Several members of the Oliver family served as early postmasters.

Geography

References

Unincorporated communities in Posey County, Indiana
Unincorporated communities in Indiana